European route E 843 is a European B class road in Italy, connecting the cities Bari – Taranto.

Route 
 
 E55 Bari
 E90 Taranto

External links 
 UN Economic Commission for Europe: Overall Map of E-road Network (2007)
 International E-road network

International E-road network
Roads in Italy